Satyrotaygetis is a monotypic butterfly genus of subfamily Satyrinae in the family Nymphalidae. Its one species, Satyrotaygetis satyrina, is found in the Neotropical realm.

References

Euptychiina
Nymphalidae of South America
Monotypic butterfly genera
Taxa named by Walter Forster (entomologist)
Taxa named by Henry Walter Bates